Bet UK is a gaming company based in Malta. It was founded in 2012 by Intellectual Property & Software Ltd (IP&S) and sold to LeoVegas Mobile Gaming Group in 2018.

Brand
Bet UK is an online casino and slots site. Targeted primarily at 25+ males it provides a wide range of slot games from various gaming providers including IGT, WMS, Red Tiger, Microgaming, Blueprint, NetEnt & Evolution.

History
Founded in 2012 Bet UK was the flagship casino brand for IP&S for the male 25-55 market. After its sale to LeoVegas Mobile Gaming Group, Bet UK became the principal sponsor of Swansea City AFC for their 2018/2019 Championship campaign.

References

External links
 

Gaming
Gaming organizations
Gambling companies of the Channel Islands